King's Highway 112, commonly referred to as Highway 112, is a provincially maintained highway in the northern portion of the Canadian province of Ontario. Formerly part of the Ferguson Highway, the route was designated with its own number in 1953, prior to which it formed a part of Highway 11. It travels east of the current Highway 11, around Round Lake and through Dane before ending at Highway 66 southwest of Kirkland Lake.

Route description 
Travelling alongside but out of site of a railway line, the highway continues north to Dame, meeting the eastern terminus of Secondary Highway 650. The route winds north, crossing the railway line before ending at Highway 66, part of the Trans-Canada Highway, between Swastika and Chaput Hughes, southwest of the primary urban area of Kirkland Lake.

Like other provincial routes in Ontario, Highway 112 is maintained by the Ministry of Transportation of Ontario. In 2010, traffic surveys conducted by the ministry showed that on average, 1,950 vehicles used the highway daily along the section between Dane and Highway 66, while 1,350 vehicles did so each day along the remainder of the route, the highest and lowest counts along the highway, respectively.

History 
Highway 112 travels along the Ferguson Highway, the original alignment of Highway 11, until the Round Lake Diversion was constructed and Highway 11 rerouted onto it. The  Ferguson Highway, mostly gravelled, was built north from New Liskeard to Cochrane via Earlton, Englehart, Dane, Swastika, Matheson, Monteith and Porquis Junction beginning in late 1923; it was complete by 1925.
During the early 1950s, the Round Lake Diversion was constructed, bypassing the original route of Highway 11 from south of Tarzwell to the present day junction with Highway 66. The original route was designated as Highway 112 upon completion of the diversion in 1953.
The route has remained unchanged since.

Major intersections

References

External links 
Google Maps: Highway 112 route

112
Roads in Timiskaming District
Kirkland Lake